Miss Antigua & Barbuda  is a national beauty pageant in Antigua & Barbuda.

History
Miss Antigua and Barbuda was established in 1957 as Carnival Queen beauty contest. Currently, the Antigua and Barbuda Festivals Commission and Calvin Southwell are the organizers of the pageant. The winners traditionally represented the island federation at the Miss World and Miss Universe pageants. Antigua and Barbuda debuted in Miss Universe in 1977 and Miss World in 1986.  The pageant was organized and promoted by Antigua and Barbuda Festivals Commission and Antigua Carnival.

2001–2008
The Miss Antigua and Barbuda was directed by Calvin Southwell.

Titleholders

Big Four pageants representatives

Miss Antigua and Barbuda Universe

The winner of Miss Antigua and Barbuda represents the country at the Miss Universe pageant. On occasion, when the winner does not qualify (due to age) a runner-up is sent.

Miss Antigua and Barbuda World

The winner of Miss World Antigua and Barbuda represents the country at the Miss World pageant. On occasion, when the winner does not qualify (due to age) a runner-up is sent.

References

External links
 antiguacarnival.com

Beauty pageants in Antigua and Barbuda
Antigua and Barbuda
Antigua and Barbuda
Recurring events established in 1957
Antigua and Barbuda awards
Antigua and Barbuda women